Lodder is a surname. Notable people with the surname include:

Arie Lodder (died 1958), Dutch murderer who was killed by John Opdam while in prison
Steve Lodder (born 1951), English musician

See also
Nel Roos-Lodder (1914–1996), Dutch discus thrower
Lodders